Sidney Roy Korshak (June 6, 1907 – January 20, 1996) was a lawyer and "fixer" for businessmen in the upper echelons of power and the Chicago Outfit in the United States. His reputation as the Chicago mob's man in Los Angeles made him one of Hollywood's most fabled and influential fixers. His partnership with Chicago mobsters led him to be named "...the most powerful lawyer in the world" by the FBI.

Early life
Sidney was born into a Jewish family, with four siblings, in Chicago's West Side Lawndale neighborhood, on June 6, 1907. His parents were Harry Korshak (January 15, 1876 – January 29, 1931) and Rebecca Beatrice Lashkovitz (1883–November 4, 1963), who were married on July 15, 1902 in Chicago. Sidney's father, Harry, was a wealthy Chicago contractor. Sidney's younger brother, Morris Jerome "Marshall" Korshak (February 6, 1910 – January 19, 1996), became a longtime Chicago politician, city treasurer and state senator. Sidney attended Herzl Elementary School, the University of Wisconsin–Madison and obtained his law degree from the DePaul University College of Law.

Career

Korshak's law practice brought him into contact with many mobsters, such as Al Capone, Frank Nitti, Sam Giancana, Tony Accardo and Moe Dalitz. His services were used by the upper ranks of both legitimate and illegitimate business in the United States.

Korshak numbered among his friends many Hollywood celebrities and leading figures in the entertainment industry, including MCA/Universal chiefs Jules C. Stein and Lew Wasserman, entertainment lawyer Paul Ziffren (the driving force behind bringing the 1984 Olympics to Los Angeles), MGM chief Kirk Kerkorian, Gulf+Western founder Charles Bluhdorn, Frank Sinatra, Ronald Reagan, William French Smith (labor attorney and future United States Attorney General), California governor Edmund "Pat" Brown and his son, California governor Edmund "Jerry" Brown, Governor of California Gray Davis, producer Robert Evans, Warren Beatty, Barron Hilton and Hugh Hefner.

Korshak was highly successful in the field of labor consulting and negotiations, and his client list included Hilton Hotels, Hyatt Hotels, MGM, Playboy, MCA/Universal, and Diners Club International. One of his clients was Jimmy Hoffa, notorious head of the International Brotherhood of Teamsters; Korshak was heavily involved in the Teamsters' west coast operations during a time when organized labor was at the peak of its activity.

Korshak was an attorney for various elements of the Chicago Outfit. Korshak bought the J.P. Seeburg Corporation and immediately before the company stock rose from $35 to $141.50 a share. He then sold 143,000 shares to pivotal figures in the stock market including Bernard Cornfeld, who owned the FOF Property Fund, in Switzerland. Korshak received $5 million from the deal.

Personal life
On August 17, 1943, Korshak married Bernice "Bee" Stewart (August 7, 1919 – September 29, 2017), daughter of Omar Stewart (May 31, 1884 – June 26, 1957) and Ethel (Granger) Stewart (August 23, 1887–January 1983).

The couple had three children:

 Harry Stuart Korshak (born April 24, 1945) who married Victoria Olson (Schmidlapp) Frederickson (born 1951) on May 2, 1975 in Los Angeles. 
 Stuart Rand Korshak (born March 6, 1947) who married Louise A. Hendricks on April 19, 1980 in Los Angeles.
 Kathryn "Katy" Korshak (granddaughter whom Sidney and Bee adopted at age 5).

Other
Sidney Korshak suggested actress Jill St. John to Eon Productions for the James Bond film, Diamonds Are Forever. Korshak had simultaneous affairs with St. John and actress Stella Stevens.

Death
Sidney Korshak died on January 20, 1996, without ever having a criminal conviction against him (or even an indictment, according to his New York Times obituary). He was buried at the Hillside Memorial Park in Culver City, California. Marshall Korshak predeceased his brother by one day.

References
Notes

Sources
 Russo, Gus; Supermob, how Sidney Korshak and his criminal associates became America's hidden power brokers- Bloomsbury, 2006
The Kid Stays in the Picture a film about Robert Evans
DeMaris, Ovid; The Last Mafioso: Jimmy "The Weasel" Fratianno

1907 births
1996 deaths
People from Beverly Hills, California
University of Wisconsin–Madison alumni
Lawyers from Chicago
Lawyers from Los Angeles
American consultants
Jewish American attorneys
Illinois lawyers
American labor lawyers
DePaul University College of Law alumni
Burials at Hillside Memorial Park Cemetery
20th-century American lawyers
Chicago Outfit
Chicago Outfit mobsters
20th-century American Jews
American people of Italian descent